Lalit Kumar Upadhyay (born 1 December 1993) is an Indian field hockey player who plays as a forward for the India national team. He was a member of the Indian team that won the bronze medal at the 2020 Olympic Games.

References

External links
 
 Lalit Upadhyay at HockeyIndia.altiusrt.com
 Lalit Upadhyay at HockeyIndia.org
 
 

1993 births
Living people
Sportspeople from Varanasi
Indian male field hockey players
Field hockey players from Uttar Pradesh
Male field hockey midfielders
Male field hockey forwards
Olympic field hockey players of India
Field hockey players at the 2020 Summer Olympics
2014 Men's Hockey World Cup players
Field hockey players at the 2018 Commonwealth Games
Field hockey players at the 2022 Commonwealth Games
Commonwealth Games silver medallists for India
Commonwealth Games medallists in field hockey
Field hockey players at the 2018 Asian Games
2018 Men's Hockey World Cup players
Asian Games bronze medalists for India
Asian Games medalists in field hockey
Medalists at the 2018 Asian Games
Olympic bronze medalists for India
Medalists at the 2020 Summer Olympics
Olympic medalists in field hockey
Recipients of the Arjuna Award
2023 Men's FIH Hockey World Cup players
Medallists at the 2022 Commonwealth Games